The Big Bend is a large meander of the Missouri River in South Dakota, now impounded by the Big Bend Dam,  to its south, as part of Lake Sharpe.

The land within the bend and on its right bank is part of the Lower Brule Indian Reservation, while the land on the left bank is part of the Crow Creek Indian Reservation.

The Lewis and Clark National Historic Trail passes through Big Bend.

External references
 National Park Service, "Big Bend of the Missouri" 
 Discovering Lewis & Clark, "The Big Bend of the Missouri" 
 Big Bend Boating & Recreation Maps 
 Missouri River Commission map, 1894

Notes

Missouri River
Geography of South Dakota